Caroline Drouin (born 7 July 1996) is a French rugby union player.

Rugby career 
Drouin was part of France's squad that placed third at the 2017 Rugby World Cup. In 2018, Her first-half try in the 18–17 victory over England played a crucial role in France winning the Six Nations Championship.

Drouin was instrumental for France in the Final Olympic Qualification Tournament as she scored a try and successfully made seven conversions to help them claim one of two available spots for the Tokyo Olympics. Her side eventually reached the Gold medal final but lost to New Zealand 26–12.

Drouin played for France in the 2021 Women's Six Nations Championship. She started at fly-half in the Six Nations final against England. She was named in France's fifteens team for the 2021 Rugby World Cup in New Zealand.

References

External links
 

1996 births
Living people
Female rugby union players
French female rugby union players
Rugby sevens players at the 2020 Summer Olympics
Medalists at the 2020 Summer Olympics
Olympic rugby sevens players of France
Olympic silver medalists for France
Olympic medalists in rugby sevens
France international women's rugby sevens players